The following are links to international rankings of the United States.

Economics
World Economic Forum 2018–2019 Global Competitiveness Report, ranked 2 out of 141 countries
World Economic Forum 2016 Global Enabling Trade Report ranked 22
The Heritage Foundation and The Wall Street Journal 2018 Index of Economic Freedom ranked 17 out of 178 economies
Fraser Institute Economic Freedom of the World  2019 Annual Report (Economic Freedom Ratings for 2017) ranked 5 out of 152 countries and territories 
 The Harvard Growth Lab ranked 12th in technological advancement, as of 2019.

Education
 Organisation for Economic Co-operation and Development 2015 Programme for International Student Assessment, ranked 40 of 72 in mathematics, 25 of 72 in science, 24 of 72 in reading

Globalization

2006 Globalization Index (A.T. Kearney) ranked 3rd 
2010 KOF Index of Globalization ranked 27

Health

, the Maternal Mortality Ratio is 46th out of the countries ranked.  (See Maternal mortality in the United States.)

Among wealthy nations, a study on 2016 data found the United States ranked first for child deaths by automobile accident and firearm, with overall child mortality 57% higher in the U.S. than other high-income countries. Though traffic deaths were decreasing, they were 5 times the rate in England and Wales; firearms deaths were increasing from a rate 100 times that in England and Wales.

, the United States life expectancy is 79.8 years at birth, ranking 42nd among 224 nations.

Peace
Vision of Humanity 2018 Global Peace Index ranked 121 out of 162 countries

Politics

 Transparency International 2019 Corruption Perceptions Index: ranked  23 out of 198 countries
Reporters Without Borders 2020 Press Freedom Index: ranked 45 out of 180 countries
Economist Intelligence Unit 2019 Democracy Index: ranked 25 out of 167 countries
World Justice Project 2020 Rule of Law Index ranked 21 out of 128 countries and jurisdictions

Standard of Living
 List of countries by Human Development Index: ranked 13 out of 189 countries for 2018
 List of countries by inequality-adjusted HDI: ranked 25 out of 151 countries for 2018

References

Foreign relations of the United States
Economy of the United States

United States